The 1976 Torneo Descentralizado, the top category of Peruvian football, was played by 16 teams. The national champion was Unión Huaral.

Teams

League table

Standings

Championship play-off

External links 
 Peru 1976 season at RSSSF
 Peruvian Football League News 

Torneo Descentralizado, 1976
Peru
Peruvian Primera División seasons